UDP-glucuronosyltransferase 2B10 is an enzyme that in humans is encoded by the UGT2B10 gene. It is responsible for glucuronidation of nicotine and cotinine.

See also
 UGT2B17

References

Further reading